Juan Caicedo can refer to:

 Juan Caicedo (footballer, born 1955)
 Juan Caicedo (footballer, born 1996)
 Juan José Caicedo
 Juan Fernando Caicedo